Perigee is a type of apsis: an extreme point in an object's orbit. 

Perigee may also refer to:
 Perigee: Publication for the Arts, a quarterly literary journal
 Holcomb Perigee, a prototype sportsplane 
 Perigee Books, a former imprint of Penguin Group, now part of TarcherPerigee

See also
Apogee (disambiguation)
Argument of periapsis
Perigea, a genus of moths 
Perigean spring tide 
Perigee moon or supermoon
Perigeo, an Italian progressive rock group